Sidney Rose Badgley (May 28, 1850 – April 29, 1917) was a prominent start-of-the-20th-century Canadian-born architect.  He was active throughout the United States and Canada, with a significant body of work in Cleveland.

Biography
Badgley was born in Ernestown Township, Ontario, Canada, and apprenticed in Toronto. He moved to Cleveland in 1887 and formed a partnership with William H. Nicklas in 1904 after Nicklas came to work for Badgley as a draftsman. The partnership was dissolved in 1913.  He designed buildings in a variety of styles, including Georgian Revival (Jones Home For Friendless Children), Gothic Revival (Calvary Baptist Church), with its lantern-dome-crowned auditorium, and Romanesque Revival (Pilgrim Congregational Church).  With Pilgrim Congregational Church, Badgley pioneered the inclusion of an institute for community use within a church building.  Badgley's design was exhibited at the Paris 1900 Exposition.  Slocum Hall, on the campus of Ohio Wesleyan University has been added to the National Register of Historic Places. Badgley died at his home at Springbrook Farm in Willoughby in 1917 and is buried at Victoria Cemetery in St. Catharines, Ontario.

Selected works

 Welland Avenue Methodist (United) Church, St. Catharines, Ontario, 1877
 St. Catharines Public Library, St. Catharines, Ontario, n.d.
 St. Andrew's Presbyterian Church, Carleton Place, Ontario, 1887
 Henry Hammersley House, 1849 East 89th Street, Cleveland, OH, 1888
 St. Paul's Methodist Episcopal Church, 473 Cumberland Street, Ottawa, 1888
 First Methodist Church, 123 West Church, Barnesville, 1888
 Frank Kitzsteiner Residence, 2075 Fairview Avenue, Cleveland, OH, 1889
 Residence for James Kyser, 2179 East 83rd Street, Cleveland, OH, 1889
 Residence for James Kyser, 2175 East 83rd Street, Cleveland, OH, 1889
 Bolton Street Presbyterian Chapel, 2114 East 89th Street, Cleveland, OH, 1890
 Euclid Avenue Church of God, Cleveland, Ohio, 1890
 Grace M. E. Church, 2408 East 83rd Street, Cleveland, OH, 1890
 George Mitchell Residence, 2168 East 79th Street, Cleveland, OH, 1890
 Residence for Will P. Todd, 2201 East 89th Street, Cleveland, OH, 1890
 United Missionary Baptist Church, 9312 Union Avenue, Cleveland, OH, 1891
 Redeemer Missionary Baptist Church (Grace Protestant Episcopal Church), 9028 Harvard Avenue, Cleveland, OH, 1891
 Superior Street Baptist Church, 2445-51 Superior Avenue, Cleveland, OH, 1891
 Free Will Baptist Church, 8402 Wade Park Avenue, Cleveland, OH, 1891
 St. Timothy Missionary Baptist Church, 7101 Carnegie Avenue, Cleveland, OH, 1891
 Hough Avenue Baptist Church, 1650 East 65th Street, Cleveland, OH, 1891
 Centenary Methodist Church, Montreal, Quebec, 1891
 Fidelity Baptist Church, Cleveland, Ohio, 1891
 St. Timothy Missionary Baptist Church (originally First United Presbyterian), Cleveland, Ohio, 1891
 Jennings Avenue Methodist Episcopal Church, 2587 West 14th Street, Cleveland, OH, 1892
 First Presbyterian Church, 22 Church Street, Gouverneur, 1892
 Wade Park Avenue Methodist Episcopal Church, 8520 Wade Park Avenue, Cleveland, OH, 1892
 Lincoln Park Methodist Episcopal Church, Cleveland, OH, 1892
 Mt. Union Methodist Episcopal Church, 1849 South Union, Alliance, OH, 1893
 Pilgrim Congregational Church, 2592 West 14th Street, Cleveland, OH, 1893
 Cedar Avenue Baptist Church, 10302 Cedar Avenue, Cleveland, OH, 1893
 Willson United Methodist Church, 1561 East 55th, Cleveland, OH, 1893
 Baptist Church, 52 Church Street, Gouverneur, NY, 1893
 Scranton Road Baptist Church, Cleveland, Ohio, 1893
 First Presbyterian Church, 300 Market Street, Warren, OH, 1894
 Trinity Methodist Church, 9900 Madison Avenue, Cleveland, OH, 1894
 Medina County Infirmary, 6144 Wedgewood Road, Medina, OH, 1894
 First Methodist Episcopal Church, 60 West Main Street, Norwalk, OH, 1894
 Glenwood Methodist Episcopal Church, Buffalo, NY, 1894
 Pilgrim Congregational Church, Cleveland, Ohio, 1894
 John Grant Residence, 2203 Cornell Road, Cleveland, OH, 1895
 First Congregational Church, 431 Columbus Street, Sandusky, OH, 1895
 First Congregational Church, 140 South Main Street, Wellington, OH, 1895
 Herman Foote Residence, 2335 East 79th Street, Cleveland, OH, 1895
 Giovanni Barricelli House, Cleveland, Ohio, 1896
 Factory for Taylor, Strong and Company, 8304 Madison Avenue, Cleveland, OH, 1896
 Mott Avenue Methodist Episcopal Church, New York City, NY, 1896
 Methodist Episcopal Church, Foochow, China, 1896
 Central Methodist (United) Church, St. Thomas, Ontario, 1897
 St. Paul's AME Zion Church, 2393 East 55th Street, Cleveland, OH, 1899
 Niles Methodist Church, 1214 North Mechanic Street, Niles, OH, 1899
 First M.E. Church, 104 West Franklin, Troy, OH, 1899
 First M.E. Church, Austin, IL, 1899
 Ohio Wesleyan Medical School, Cleveland, Ohio, 1900
 Charles Elson Residence, 1762 Crawford Road, Cleveland, OH, 1900
 Residence for F. W. Robinson, 1733 East 60th Street, Cleveland, OH, 1900
 Commercial-Residential Building, Central and Bertram, Cleveland, OH, 1900
 Millburn Memorial M.E. Church, South Bend, IL, 1900
 First Congregational Church, 3232 Pearl Avenue, Lorain, Ohio, 1900
 Gammon United Methodist Church (currently the North American Motherhouse of Fraternite Notre Dame), Chicago, Illinois, 1900 original design by Badgley, rebuilt after fire to Badgley's original design again in 1909
 Kinsman Street Congregational Church, 5719 Kinsman, Cleveland, OH, 1901
 First M. E. Church, 1601 Charleston Avenue, Matoon, 1901
 Two family residence for Harry Morganthaler, 1510-2 East 84th Street, Cleveland, OH, 1901
 St. Pauls Methodist Episcopal Church, 933 West Colfax, South Bend, OH, 1901
 Mark Thomson Residence, 1680 East 85th Street, Cleveland, OH, 1901
 Jones Home for Friendless Children, Cleveland, Ohio, 1902
 St. Paul's Memorial United Methodist Church, South Bend, Indiana, 1903
 Lakewood United Methodist Church, Cleveland, Ohio, 1904
 Cleveland Heights Presbyterian Church, Cleveland, Ohio, 1904
 Central Methodist (United) Church, Calgary, Alberta, 1905
 St. John AME Church, Cleveland, Ohio, 1908
 Grace Methodist Church, Zanesville, Ohio, 1909
 Fourth Reformed Church, Cleveland, Ohio, 1909
 Trinity United Methodist Chursh, Athens, Tennessee 1910
 Fidelity Baptist Church, Cleveland, OH, 1911
 First Presbyterian Church, Wichita, Kansas, 1912
 Dominion Methodist Church, 687 Avenue Roslyn, Westmount, 1914
 First Methodist Episcopal Church, 501 Main Street, Wellsville, Kansas, 1914
 First Presbyterian Church, Howell, Michigan, 1914–1915
 First United Methodist Church, Shenandoah, Iowa

NRHP-listed U.S. works
Works by Badgley that are listed on the U.S. National Register of Historic Places, and likely preserved, include:
Calvary Baptist Church, 747 Broad St. 	Providence 	RI 	Badgley,Sidney Rose
Deering Memorial United Methodist Church, 39 Main St. 	Paris 	ME 	Badgley and Nicklas
Highland Park Presbyterian Church, 14 Cortland St. 	Highland Park 	MI 	Badgley,Sidney Rose
Jones Home for Children, 3518 W. Twenty-fifth St. 	Cleveland 	OH 	Badgley,Sidney R.
Pilgrim Congregational Church, 2592 W. 14th St. 	Cleveland 	OH 	Badgley,Sidney R.
Slocum Hall, OWU Main Campus, Sandusky St. 	Delaware 	OH 	Badgley,S.R.
St. John's AME Church, 2261 E. 40th St. 	Cleveland 	OH 	Badgley & Nicklas
Woodward Ave. Presbyterian Church, 8501 Woodward Ave. 	Detroit 	MI 	Badgley,Sidney Rose
One or more properties in Austin Town Hall Park Historic District 	Roughly bounded by West Lake St., N. Central Ave., N. Parkside Ave., and West Race Ave. 	Chicago 	IL 	(Badgley, Sidney R.)
First Presbyterian Church, Howell, Michigan, (part of the Howell Downtown Historic District,) 323 West Grand River Avenue, Howell, MI

Notes

External links

Sources
Tomlan, Mary Raddant and Michael A.  Richmond, Indiana: Its Physical and Aesthetic Heritage to 1920, Indianapolis: Indiana Historical Society, 2003
Loring,Ken and the 150th Anniversary Committee, First Presbyterian Church, Howell, Michigan, Our Heritage, 1838–1988, Howell, Michigan, 323 West Grand River, Howell, Michigan, Self-published by the Church, 1988 First Presbyterian Church
Cleveland Architects Database: Sidney R. Badgley
Cleveland Architects Database: Badgley and Nicklas

1850 births
1917 deaths
Canadian architects
Architects from Cleveland
People from Lennox and Addington County
Canadian expatriates in the United States